The Shivalli Brahmins are a Hindu community in Karnataka. They are divided into two groups, the first of who follow the Dvaita philosophy founded by the Vaishnava saint Madhvacharya of Udupi are called Shivalli Madhva Brahmins, and the second of who follow the Advaita philosophy of Adi Shankara are known as Shivalli Smartha Brahmins. Majority of Shivalli Brahmins are Madhvas and only a few of them are Smarthas.

Udupi cuisine 

Shivalli Brahmins are famous for Udupi hotels (vegetarian restaurants) known for serving typical south Indian dishes like idli, vada, dosa, shira and upma etc. Shivalli Brahmins have a unique style of cooking, serving and eating meals. The meal is served on a plantain (banana) leaf and is usually eaten by hand, seated with padmasana like position on the floor. As per traditions male members must be bare-chested while eating a meal and must not talk except for deveranama (bhajan). While having meals, all Brahmins including women and children must start and end their meal together. No one should get up during the meals. The meal is wholesome and elaborate in preparation, serving and eating.

Rituals and customs

Rituals 

Shivalli Brahmin males undergo the Upanayana when they turn seven years old to initiate them into Vedic studies. It is also known as Brahmopadesham. The key ritual during the Upanayana is that of putting a sacred thread consisting of three cotton strands across the left shoulder of the boy. The initiate is called a dvija "twice-born" and is expected to perform the sandhyavandanam at least twice daily. Dvija has a special knot in it which is called as "Brahma Gantu". Shivalli Madhwa Brahmins also undergo the Upakarma, where the sacred thread is changed and mudradharana is done. Mudradharana is a ritual where Vaishnavite symbols like the conch or the wheel are etched on bodies as a ritual of purification. Currently, the prevalent practice is to paint the symbols using gopichandana paste. In old Vedas it is mentioned that after upanayana he enters the stage of Brahmacharya ashram, leading a celibate and austere life of a student in his teacher's home, eating from handouts given by the generous neighbors. It is equivalent to say he will undergo studies excluding all other aspects in modern days.
When he has accomplished his studies of the Vedas, he enters the Grahastha ashram, a married man becoming head of his household. This dvija also called "Janivara" is replaced with six cotton strands during the wedding.

In Tulunadu (consisting of present Udupi, Dakshina Kannada, and Kasargodu districts). Every Shivalli Madhva Brahmin household has its own Bhoota and Nagadevata. These deities were worshiped by household members. Today because of modernisation and emigration they are followed in some households only.

Marriage 
Present day marriages of Shivalli Madhva Brahmins are a four-day ceremony, sometimes condensed to a single day due to the fast pace of today's life. In the three-day ritual, the process of marriage starts with Naandi (literally meaning start). During Naandi, which takes place in the groom's and bride's homes separately, but at the same time, a ceremony is performed where the bride and groom have coconut oil and turmeric applied to them and are bathed in hot water followed by other rituals. Marriage (Madimae in Tulu) takes place at a temple, hall or auditorium followed by lunch. All the ceremonies are held as per horoscopes of bride and groom at a particular time called muhurtha. Generally the day after marriage, a ceremony called the Bigara authana (a sort of reception) is held at the groom's place and consists of the Satyanarayana puja and other rituals followed by lunch. The bigara authana is an equivalent of the marriage reception. The fourth day is a small function at the bride's house named as "Aarthakshathe." It is a ritual where shamiana (house decorative) will be removed concluding end of the ceremony. Bride and groom's Basinga (a wearing specially worn on the wedding day) is tied to a pole in the bride's house and the newly married couple will start their new life with elders' (hiriyer) blessings.

Festivals 
Shivalli Brahmins celebrate all major Hindu festivals such as Ganesh Chaturthi, Deepavali, Navaratri, Sankranti, Madhwanavami, Janmashtami, Maha Shivaratri, Bisu Parba(Tulu New Year), Ramanavami, Hanuman Jayanthi etc. They also believe in Nagaradhane and rituals of Bhuta Kola.

See also 
Tuluva Brahmins
Ahichatra
Nambudiri
Krishnapura matha
Paryaya

Notes

References 
Gururaja Bhat, P., Studies in Tuluva History and Culture, 1975.
Gururaja Bhat, P., Tuḷunāḍu, 1963
Hebbar, Neria H., "Customs and Classes of Hinduism", 2 March 2003.
Hebbar, Neria H., "The Tale of Tuluva Brahmins", p. 2, 12 January 2003.
Kakkilaya, B. Srinivas, "The History of Shivalli Brahmins", 25 July 2005.
Rajalakshmi, U.B., Udupi Cuisine, Bangalore: Prism Books, .
Saletore, B.A., Ancient Karnataka History of Tuluva, vol. I, 1936.

External links 
 Shivalli Brahmins

Tulu Brahmins
Karnataka society
Kannada Brahmins
Udupi
Mangalorean society
Kerala society
Social groups of Karnataka
Social groups of Kerala